Gary Foss Graver (July 20, 1938 – November 16, 2006) was an American film director, editor, screenwriter and cinematographer. He was a prolific filmmaker, working in various roles on over 300 films, but is best known as Orson Welles' final cinematographer, working over a period of six years on Welles' epic film The Other Side of the Wind which was released in 2018, 48 years after it was started.

Graver began his career in the late 1960s as a cinematographer and editor of various B-movies, including several films by Roger Corman, before providing additional camerawork on John Cassavetes's A Woman Under the Influence (1974). He continued to serve as the cinematographer of numerous horror films from the late 1970s and through the 1980s, including The Toolbox Murders (1978), Trick or Treats (1982), which he also wrote, edited, and directed; Mortuary (1983), They're Playing with Fire (1984), and Twisted Nightmare (1988).

Under the pseudonym of Robert McCallum, Graver was also a prolific director of adult films, working as a cinematographer and director on 135 features.

Early life
Graver was born July 20, 1938 in Portland, Oregon, to Raleigh and Frances Graver. His father was a native Oregonian, while his mother was born in Washington state. Graver was raised in Portland, where he attended Grant High School. As a teenager, he produced and starred in his own radio show, and built a movie theatre in his parents' basement where he showed his own 16 mm films. He also acted in stage productions for the Portland Civic Theatre.

At age twenty, Graver moved to Hollywood to become an actor, and studied acting with Lee J. Cobb. He was drafted into the U.S. military in the early 1960s and was assigned to the Navy Combat Camera Group, where he was trained as a professional cameraman while touring in Vietnam, the Philippines, and Japan.

Career

Feature films
After returning to civilian life, Graver began his career in Los Angeles working on documentaries for a year before starting to work on larger budget features. Graver wrote and directed his first film, The Embracers, in 1966. He would subsequently serve as the cinematographer and editor on the B-films The Mighty Gorga, The Fabulous Bastard from Chicago, and Satan's Sadists (all 1969).

In 1970, Graver made an unannounced inquiry to Orson Welles, saying he wanted to work with the director. Welles told Graver that only one other person had ever called him to say they wanted to work with him—Gregg Toland who, had worked with Welles on Citizen Kane.

"From that day forward, Orson Welles was the central figure in Gary Graver's life: more important than his wife, his children, his bank account, and his health.  For the rest of Orson's life (and his own) Graver belonged to the great director." Soon after, Welles and Graver started work on the unfinished film The Other Side of the Wind, in addition to other projects Welles had in the works including F for Fake (1973) and Filming Othello (1978).

Graver's work for Welles was unpaid, and during the shooting of one scene in The Other Side of the Wind, Welles used as a prop his 1941 Oscar that he won as the co-writer of Citizen Kane. When shooting was finished, he handed the statuette to Graver saying, "Here, keep this." Graver understood this to be a gift in lieu of payment for his work. Graver held onto the award for several years until he ran into financial trouble in the 1990s, and in 1994 he sold it for $50,000. The purchaser, a company called Bay Holdings, then attempted to sell it at auction through Sotheby's in London. When Welles's daughter Beatrice Welles learned of the intended sale, she successfully sued both Graver and the holding company to stop it. She eventually took possession of the statuette before attempting to sell it herself, however Christie's withdrew it from auction after the Academy objected to the sale.

Besides his work with Welles, Graver also worked for other Hollywood directors including Roger Corman and Fred Olen Ray. The bulk of his output was B-movies since, as he put it, "I knew how to make a movie without much money." While working on The Other Side of the Wind between 1970 and 1976, Graver worked as a cinematographer and editor in various other B-horror films such as Blood Mania (1970), Dracula vs. Frankenstein (1971), and Invasion of the Bee Girls (1973). He also contributed additional camerawork on John Cassavetes's A Woman Under the Influence (1974). In 1977, he served as cinematographer for Ron Howard's Grand Theft Auto, followed by the cult horror film The Toolbox Murders (1978).

In 1982, Graver wrote, directed, edited, and produced the slasher film Trick or Treats, after which he served as cinematographer on the slasher film Mortuary (1983), and the comedy Chattanooga Choo Choo (1984). He directed the thriller film Moon in Scorpio starring Britt Ekland in 1987, followed by a cinematography credit on Twisted Nightmare (1988). The following year, Graver provided additional cinematography on Steven Spielberg's Always (1989), working on the film's Montana unit.

Adult films
Throughout his career in mainstream cinema, Graver also worked as a writer and director of pornographic films, often credited as Robert McCallum. Graver's work in the adult film industry resulted in more than 135 films including Unthinkable, which won the AVN Award for Best All-Sex Video in 1985. Graver was later inducted into the AVN Hall of Fame for his contributions to the adult film industry.

Death
Graver died on November 16, 2006 at his home in Rancho Mirage, California after a lengthy battle with cancer. His widow, former actress Jillian Kesner, died the following year of complications of a staph infection, which she contracted after having been diagnosed with leukemia. Graver had two sons from previous marriages.

Graver's memoir Making Movies with Orson Welles, co-written by Andrew J. Rausch, was published posthumously by Scarecrow Press in 2008.

Select filmography

Publications

References

External links
 
 
 
 
 Gary Graver interview at Wellesnet
 Unhappy with the way he felt producers sometimes butchered his work, in 2004 Graver made a documentary outlining his grievances. The entire documentary was posted on YouTube in several parts: .

1938 births
2006 deaths
American cinematographers
American film directors
American film editors
American pornographic film directors
Artists from Portland, Oregon
Deaths from cancer in California
Filmmakers from Portland, Oregon
Grant High School (Portland, Oregon) alumni
Screenwriters from Oregon
Writers from Portland, Oregon
Film producers from Oregon
20th-century American screenwriters